Gim Hongdo (김홍도, born 1745, died 1806?-1814?), also known as Kim Hong-do, most often styled Danwon (단원), was a full-time painter of the Joseon period of Korea. He was together a pillar of the establishment and a key figure of the new trends of his time, the  'true view painting'. Gim Hong-do was an exceptional artist in every field of traditional painting, even if he is mostly remembered nowadays for his depictions of the everyday life of ordinary people, in a manner analogous to the Dutch Masters.

Biography
Danwon was a member of the Gimhae Gim clan. He grew up in present-day Ansan, South Korea.
At the age of 7, Gim Hong-do studied under the renowned master Pyoam Kang Se-hwang, who was then living in seclusion in Ansan. In 1766, at the age of 21, on the recommendation of Kang Sehwang, he entered the royal service as a member (hwawon) of the Dohwaseo, the official painters of the Joseon court. In 1771, he painted the portrait of the Royal Heir (the future King Jeongjo). In 1773, he assisted Byeon Sang-byeok when painting the Royal Portrait of King Yeongjo (1694–1724–1776).

In 1776, he painted the "Nineteen Taoist Immortals", that skyrocketed his reputation as a painter. At the same time, the new instated King Jeongjo (1752–1776–1800) commissioned him for many institutional paintings.

He died in loneliness and poverty, though the circumstances, and even the year are unknown. Sources are guessing 1806, circa 1810, or after 1814.

Legacy
Danwon is remembered today as one of the "Three Wons," together with Hyewon and Owon. He is also often joined to Owon and the 15th-century painter An Gyeon as one of Joseon's three greatest painters.

The city of Ansan, where he spent his youth and learned his craft, has memorialized him in many ways. The district of Danwon-gu is named after him, as is Ansan's annual "Danwon Art Festival."  Many public places have been designed in imitation of his works.

Gallery
Various sources have various opinions about what could be a 'top ten' list for Gim Hong-do. The most important fact is how successful was Gim Hong-do in all the various types of paintings.

Towooart provides a short notice and an argumented selection of paintings. The Korean Copyright Commission lists 757 paintings, 7 calligraphies and 4 moldings for Gim Hong-do. Some paintings have multiple descriptions: often a sepia version is given with a very fine resolution, and a colorful one with a lower resolution. An example is "Feast for the Pyongyang Governor" (평양감사 향안도).

 The paintings that launched the reputation of Gim Hongdo.

 'Literati' paintings.

 Official paintings

 The designated painter of the King

 "Genre paintings". Among them, the album Danwon pungsokdo provides a serie of 25 paintings. Here are only four of them:

 After 1800 and the death of King Jeongjo.

Fictional portrayals

Literature
The novel Painter of the Wind, by Lee Jeong-myeong, is centered on Danwon and Hyewon, who is portrayed as a woman disguised as a man.

Film and television
 Portrayed by Park Shin-yang in the 2008 SBS TV series Painter of the Wind.
 Portrayed by Kim Young-ho in the 2008 film Portrait of a Beauty.
 Portrayed by Kim Da-hyun in the 2011 SBS TV series Warrior Baek Dong-soo.

See also

Danwon pungsokdo cheop
Korean painting
List of Korean painters

References

Bibliography

External links
Encyclopedia of Korean culture-Gim hong do
Arts of Korea, an exhibition catalog from The Metropolitan Museum of Art Libraries (fully available online as PDF), which contains material on Gim Hong-do

1745 births
19th-century deaths
18th-century Korean painters
Gimhae Kim clan
18th-century Korean poets
People from Ansan